Zoran Tomić (24 October 1958 – 14 June 1989) was a Bosnian football midfielder who played for clubs in Yugoslavia and Turkey.

Career
Born in Mramor, Tomić played with FK Sloboda Tuzla in the Yugoslav First League during his nine seasons with the club.

Tomić signed with Turkish second division side Orduspor for two seasons in 1986. He moved to Süper Lig side Samsunspor in 1988, where he would make 16 league appearances before his death.

Personal
The Samsunspor team bus was involved in a traffic accident on the way to a match in Malatya on 20 January 1989, killing the team coach, two players and the bus driver instantly. Tomić went into a coma and died six months later. After the accident, Samsunspor added the color of "black" their official club colors.

References

External links
 Profile at Turksports.net
 

1958 births
1989 deaths
Yugoslav footballers
FK Sloboda Tuzla players
Orduspor footballers
Samsunspor footballers
Expatriate footballers in Turkey
Association football midfielders
Road incident deaths in Turkey